Mylocheilus caurinus, the peamouth, peamouth chub, redmouth sucker or northwestern dace, is a species of freshwater ray-finned fish from the family Cyprinidae, the carps and minnows, that is found in western North America.  It is the only species in its genus.

Description
The  peamouth is a slender fish, with a somewhat compressed body and a subterminal mouth, large eyes, a rounded snout and a forked tail. It has a dark back, contrasting with silvery underparts separated by two dusky, longitudinal stripes. The mouth is reddish at the corners where there are small barbels. When breeding the mature males develop a red stripe along the sides on the belly, mouth, gill cover and pectoral fin base. The dorsal fin and the anal fin each have 8 soft rays and the lateral line has 66-84 scales.

Distribution
The peamouth occurs in western North America from the Mackenzie River in the North West Territories, the Nass River and the Peace River in British Columbia and the Columbia River drainage in Washington state, Oregon, Montana and Idaho.  It is relatively tolerant of salt water and this has allowed it to colonise rivers on Vancouver Island and other islands off the coast of British Columbia. It has been introduced to the Redwood National Park in California.

Habitat
The peamouth can be found in the shallow, weedy zones of lakes and rivers, where it is most common among vegetation.

Biology
Young peamouths feed predominantly on micro-crustaceans which are also preyed on by the adult fish but their diet is expanded to include snails, adult aquatic and terrestrial insects and even the occasional small fish.

The peamouth reaches sexual maturity at 3–4 years old, the males normally reaching it faster than the females. The eggs adhere to rocks or other substrates. The fish may spawn several times in a season, and the timing of spawning is not fully understood. The spawning runs of the peamouth make an impressive natural spectacle as the brightly colored fish move into areas of warm, shallow, flowing water in large numbers. These schools attract many fish-eating predators. The newly hatched fry form schools near the shore, moving into deeper water later in the summer. Each female is normally attended by at least two males and can lay between 5,000 and 30,000 eggs, the amount being dependent on the age and size of the individual fish.

The fish may spend the day in deeper water and move to the shallows to feed at night. They are preyed on by a variety of piscivorous mammals and birds, as well as by larger fish species. They may attain a life span of 8 years

Human use
They have been used as a food fish by people the past and are still fished for by anglers. In Bellevue City near Seattle has an online alert system which informs people when the peamouth appear to spawn in the local streams so that interested people can observe the spectacle, being informed by email whenever the fish are observed.

Hybridisation
Hybrids between the peamouth and the Northern pikeminnow (Ptychocheilus oregonensis) and the redside shiner (Richardsonius balteatus) have been recorded in Montana.

References

Leuciscinae
Monotypic fish genera
Fish of North America
Fish of the United States
Fish described in 1836